Mirko Andrić (born 1 June 1974) is a Serbian former football defender.

References

External links
 
 

1974 births
Living people
Sportspeople from Loznica
Association football defenders
Serbian footballers
FK Loznica players
FK Radnički Niš players
FK Mladost Lučani players
FK Srem players
FK Budućnost Banatski Dvor players
FK Smederevo players
FK Modriča players
Serbian SuperLiga players